This is a list of twin towns and sister cities in the continent of Europe – that is, pairs of local government entities in different countries which have twinning arrangements.  Where known, the date of formation of the twinning agreement is included in parentheses.

Note that the list is likely to always remain incomplete, since no canonical list of such arrangements exists; even those towns that are listed may well have arrangements which are not listed here.
A searchable, interactive list is maintained by Sister Cities International.  Such arrangements are listed at both locations in these lists.

Albania

Austria

Azerbaijan

Belarus

Belgium

Bosnia and Herzegovina

Bulgaria

Croatia

Czech Republic

Denmark

Estonia

Faroe Islands

Finland

France

Georgia

Germany

Gibraltar
Kingston, Jamaica
Funchal, Portugal
Goole, England, United Kingdom
Ballymena, Northern Ireland, United Kingdom

Greece

Greenland

Hungary

Iceland

Ireland

Italy

Jersey
Funchal, Portugal

Kosovo

Latvia

Lithuania

Luxembourg

Malta

Moldova

Montenegro

Netherlands

North Macedonia

Norway

Poland

Portugal

Romania

Russia

San Marino

Serbia

Slovakia

Slovenia

Spain

Sweden

Switzerland

Turkey

Ukraine

United Kingdom

Notes

References

Twin towns